General Sir Ian Hurry Riches,  (27 September 1908 – 23 December 1996) was a Royal Marines officer who served as Commandant General Royal Marines from 1959 to 1962.

Military career
Educated at University College School, Riches joined the Royal Marines in 1927. He served in the Second World War and was awarded the Distinguished Service Order for his service during the Italian Campaign. He became commanding officer of 42 Commando in 1948, commander of 3 Commando Brigade in 1954, and commander of the Infantry Training Centre Royal Marines in 1955. He went on to be General Officer Commanding the Portsmouth Group of the Royal Marines in 1957 and Commandant General Royal Marines in 1959 before retiring in 1962. He was appointed a Knight Commander of the Order of the Bath in the 1960 Birthday Honours.

In retirement Riches became a Regional Director of Civil Defence.

References

External links
Obituary in the Independent

1908 births
1996 deaths
Royal Marines generals
Royal Marines personnel of World War II
Knights Commander of the Order of the Bath
20th-century Royal Marines personnel
Companions of the Distinguished Service Order